Schistura greenei is a species of stone loach in the genus Schistura from the upper Salween in Yunnan. It was described  in 2017 and does not feature in Fishbase yet.

References 

G
Fish described in 2017